Philippe Liégeois (born 8 July 1947) is a Belgian comic book artist. He is best known by his pen name Turk. He is the co-author of numerous comic books, including Colonel Clifton, Léonard and Robin Dubois. His usual writer for all three series is Bob de Groot, and the duo "Turk & De Groot" has been very successful.

Biography
Liégeois was born in the city of Durbuy, Belgium. The house is now converted to a hotel-restaurant, with a small plaquette at the door denoting the birthplace. Philippe is a French-speaking Belgian, living in the Ardennes near Namur, Belgium.

Bibliography
Comics work includes:

Colonel Clifton (1970–1983)
Léonard (1976–ongoing)
Robin Dubois

Notes

References

Philippe Liégeois at Bedetheque

External links 
 

Belgian comics artists
Belgian caricaturists
Belgian humorists
1947 births
Living people
People from Durbuy